Rik Battaglia (byname of Caterino Bertaglia; 18 February 1927 – 27 March 2015) was an Italian film actor. He was born at Corbola, near Rovigo, Veneto. 
He mainly used the stage name of Rik Battaglia although alternate names he used for his films included Rick Austin, Riccardo Battaglia and Rick Battaglia. He would go on to appear in over 100 films from the 1955 to 1999.

Biography
He went to sea at the age of 17 and worked on a freighter. He was discovered in a bar and producer Carlo Ponti hired him on the spot and signed to his first film in 1955's The River Girl, directed by Mario Soldati and opposite Sophia Loren, playing a cigarette smuggler who has a tempestuous love affair with a young and sexy Sophia Loren (Ponti's wife). He then played the title role in Pietro Francisci's 1956 historical movie Roland the Mighty.

He then took two years of drama classes and appeared in a number of historical and peplum films, such as The Mighty Crusaders (1958, Carlo Ludovico Bragaglia), Hannibal (1959, Carlo Ludovico Bragaglia, Edgar G. Ulmer), Caesar the Conqueror (1962, Tanio Boccia), and A Queen for Caesar (1962, Piero Pierotti). He was also seen in the Hollywood adventure Raw Wind in Eden (1958, Richard Wilson). He also played in Esther and the King (1960), From a Roman Balcony (1960, by Mauro Bolognini) and in the biblical epic Sodom and Gomorrah (1962, by Robert Aldrich).

Battaglia appeared in adventure films such as Attack of the Moors (1959, Mario Costa), The Conqueror of the Orient (1960, Tanio Boccia), The Lion of St. Mark (1963, Luigi Capuano) and Sandokan the Great (1963, Umberto Lenzi), and horror films such as Nightmare Castle (1965, Mario Caiano).

He became a regular in the Karl May films, and in Spaghetti Westerns and adventure films. Some of these included Old Shatterhand  (1963), The Pyramid of the Sun God (1965), Legacy of the Incas (1965), Winnetou and Old Firehand (1966), Black Jack (1968), The Valley of Death (1968), Duck, You Sucker! (1971), The Call of the Wild (1972), White Fang (1973), Challenge to White Fang (1974) and A Man Called Blade (1977). His other films included 'Tis Pity She's a Whore (1971),  Treasure Island (1972, as Captain Smollett), the Agatha Christie  adaptation Ten Little Indians (1974), the Sergio Leone co-produced western A Genius, Two Partners and a Dupe (1975), and Vincente Minnelli's A Matter of Time (1976). Battaglia also appeared in Deported Women of the SS Special Section (1976), Suor Emanuelle (1977), Il prefetto di ferro  (1977), Return of the 38 Gang (1977), Zappatore (1980) and Don Bosco (1988). His last feature film was Buck ai confini del cielo (1991) he retired from films in 1999.

Selected filmography

The River Girl (1954) - Gino Lodi
Rice Girl (1956) - Gianni
Liane, Jungle Goddess (1956) - Crewman (uncredited)
Roland the Mighty (1956) - Orlando / Roland
Engaged to Death (1957) - Carlo
Liane, die weiße Sklavin (1957) - Ibrahim
The Mighty Crusaders (1958) - Rinaldo d'Este
Raw Wind in Eden (1958) - Gavino
Adorabili e bugiarde (1958) - Giorgio Pitagora
 (1958) - Joschi Türk
Prisoner of the Volga (1959) - Lt. Lisenko
Caterina Sforza, la leonessa di Romagna (1959)
Attack of the Moors (1959) - Roland, Count of Besançon
Hannibal (1959) - Hasdrubal
The Conqueror of the Orient (1960) - Nadir
From a Roman Balcony (1960) - Carpiti
Esther and the King (1960) - Simon
Minotaur, the Wild Beast of Crete (1960) - Demetrio
Don't Bother to Knock (1961) - Guilio
Liane, die Tochter des Dschungels (1961)
Caesar the Conqueror (1962) - Vercingetorix
Sodom and Gomorrah (1962) - Melchior
A Queen for Caesar (1962) - Lucio Settimio
 (1963) - Conrad von Berthold
The Lion of St. Mark (1963, Luigi Capuano) - Jandolo
Sandokan the Great (1963) - Sambigliong
Son of the Circus (1963) - Steffi
Old Shatterhand  (1964) - Dixon
 The Shoot (1964) - Nirwan
Freddy in the Wild West (1964) - Steve Perkins
 The Treasure of the Aztecs (1965) - Capt. Lazoro Verdoja
The Pyramid of the Sun God (1965)  - Captain Lazaro Verdoja
The Adventurer of Tortuga (1965) - Pedro Valverde
Nightmare Castle (1965, Mario Caiano) - David
 Legacy of the Incas (1965) - Antonio Perillo
The Desperado Trail (1965) - Rollins
Winnetou and Old Firehand (1966) - Capt. Mendoza
Bitter Fruit (1967) - Sebastian
Feuer frei auf Frankie (1967) - Drummer
Long Days of Hate (1968) - Vic Graham
Radhapura - Endstation der Verdammten (1968) - Manuel
The Longest Hunt (1968) - Capt. Norton
Black Jack (1968) - Skinner
The Valley of Death (1968) - Murdock
La battaglia del deserto (1969) - Bob
Chapaqua's Gold (1970) - Murphy
Hey Amigo! A Toast to Your Death (1970) - Barnett
La grande scrofa nera (1971)
'Tis Pity She's a Whore (1971) - Mercante
Duck, You Sucker! (1971) - Santerna
Deadly Trackers (1972) - Montana
Treasure Island (1972) - Captain Smollett
The Call of the Wild (1972) - Dutch Harry
Canterbury n° 2 - Nuove storie d'amore del '300 (1973) - Averagus
La isla misteriosa y el capitán Nemo (1973) - Finch
White Fang (1973) - Jim Hall
Ten Little Indians (1974) - Vendedor
Legend of the Sea Wolf (1975)
A Genius, Two Partners and a Dupe (1975) - Captain
Blue Belle (1976) - Superintendent
Una vita venduta (1976)
A Matter of Time (1976) - Nina's Father
Deported Women of the SS Special Section (1976) - Dr. Schubert
Il mondo dei sensi di Emy Wong (1977)
Suor Emanuelle (1977) - Catsabriaga
Mannaja (1977) - Gerald Merton
Il prefetto di ferro (1977) - Antonio Capecelatro
Return of the 38 Gang (1977) - Police Commissioner
The Greatest Battle (1978) - French Partisan
The New Godfathers (1979) - Don Calogero Avallone
Napoli... la camorra sfida, la città risponde (1979) - Dott. Rampone
Lo scugnizzo (1979)
Zappatore (1980) - Don Andrea Amitrano
La tua vita per mio figlio (1980) - Don Calogero
Bomber (1982)
Giuramento (1982) - Frank Geraci
Liberté, égalité, choucroute (1985) - De La Fayette
White Slave (1985) - Catherine's Father (uncredited)
Il pentito (1985)
Detective School Dropouts (1986) - Don Zanetti
Giuro che ti amo (1986)
Don Bosco (1988) - Michele Cavour
La ragazza del metrò (1989) - Andrea
Diva Futura - L'avventura dell'amore (1989)
Omicidio a luci blu (1991) - Bill
Buck ai confini del cielo (1991) - Bauman
Rodjen kao ratnik (1994) - Bogie

References

External links
 

1927 births
2015 deaths
People from the Province of Rovigo
Italian male film actors